Athisaya Thirudan is 1958 Indian Tamil-language film directed by P. Pullaiah and produced by S. Bhavanarayanan and D. B. Narayanan.  The film's script and lyrics was written by Thanjai N. Ramaiah Dass. Soundtrack was composed by S. Dakshinamurthi and K. Prasad Rao. The film stars Gemini Ganesan portraying the titular character, with Savitri, T. S. Balaiah, K. A. Thangavelu, T. P. Muthulakshmi and V. Nagayya in supporting roles.

Plot 

The story is about a crafty thief and a wicked Minister Neelakalakantam out to rob the state's finances and is also after many women, one of them Gowri (Savitri), who is in love with thief character, she takes him to a Saint to give up his thieving ways. The plans works. However, in order to expose the Minister, he is forced to break his promise. While trying to open the palace's jewel safe that contains four rare diamonds, he meets an old one-eyed beggar (who is actually the King in disguise). The villain finally gets exposed, with the lovers uniting, with the blessing of the King.

Cast 
 Gemini Ganesan as Athisaya Thirudan
 Savitri as Gowri
 T. S. Balaiah as Neelakalkantam
 K. A. Thangavelu as the King
 T. P. Muthulakshmi as the Queen
 V. Nagayya as the Saint
 Baby Rajakumari as Pachai
 K. Nadarajan as Kannaiah
 K. N. Kamalam as Gowri's mother

Soundtrack 
Music was composed by S. Dakshinamurthi and K. Prasad Rao. Lyrics were by Thanjai N. Ramaiah Dass.Playback singers are T. M. Soundararajan, Seerkazhi Govindarajan, S. C. Krishnan, S. V. Ponnusamy, P. Susheela, Jikki, K. Jamuna Rani and S. Janaki

The song about Muruga, "Muruga Endrathum Urugaadhaa Manam", became popular.

Reception 
Kanthan of Kalki said Savitri performed well from the beginning to the end.

References

External links 
 

1950s Tamil-language films
1958 films
Films scored by Susarla Dakshinamurthi
Indian black-and-white films